Jeroen Kijk in de Vegte (born 14 June 1974) is a Dutch television presenter, radio DJ and voice actor. He was one of the sidekicks in the radio show ruuddewild.nl presented by Ruud de Wild.

Career 

He was the voice over for Eigen Huis & Tuin from 1996 to 2020.

In 2003, he presented the television show Veronica Vibes which was not very successful.

In 2017, he participated in the 17th season of the popular television show Wie is de Mol?. In 2020, he appeared in a special anniversary edition of the show, called Wie is de Mol? Renaissance, which featured only contestants of previous seasons. He was the titular Mol of that season.

Since July 2018, he is the co-host of the morning show Jan-Willem Start Op! on national public broadcaster NPO Radio 2 and since August 2008 he is the main voice-over for RTL Boulevard, a daily entertainment news show, on RTL 4

In 2021, Jan-Willem Roodbeen and Kijk in de Vegte won the Gouden RadioRing 2020 for their morning radio show Jan-Willem Start Op!.

Personal life 

On 6 May 2002, he witnessed the assassination of Pim Fortuyn in Hilversum, North Holland which took place in a car park outside the radio studio where Fortuyn had just given an interview to Kijk in de Vegte and his colleague Ruud de Wild.

Filmography

As contestant 

 2017: Wie is de Mol?
 2020: Wie is de Mol? Renaissance (anniversary season)

References

External links 
 

Living people
1974 births
People from Emmeloord
Dutch television presenters
Dutch radio presenters